The GAZ-2332 / GAZ CityVan (russ. ГАЗ-2332) was a light van developed by the Russian automaker GAZ and presented as a prototype at an apparently advanced stage of development in 2006. The van was shown with seating for two and a load area capable of carrying between 500 and 1,000 kg.

As well as the delivery van, the manufacturer intended to offer a passenger carrying version with seating for five.   In 2006 it was foreseen that volume production would start in 2007, but a year later the company's finances had become more stretched and the GAZ CityVan has not entered production.

References

External links
 

GAZ Group vehicles
Vans